
A jumping jack, also known as a star jump and called a side-straddle hop in the US military, is a physical jumping exercise performed by jumping to a position with the legs spread wide and the hands going overhead, sometimes in a clap, and then returning to a position with the feet together and the arms at the sides.

The name origin for the jumping jack exercise has sometimes erroneously been identified as World War I U.S. General John J. "Black Jack" Pershing, who is said to have developed the exercise, but in fact the name comes from the jumping jack children's toy, which makes similar arm swing and leg splay motions when the strings are tugged.

Although he played no part in inventing the exercise, the late fitness expert Jack LaLanne was given credit for popularizing it in the United States. LaLanne used the jumping exercise during routines he promoted in decades of television fitness programming.

Variations
More intensive versions of this jump include bending down (over) and touching the floor in between each jump.

Power jacks
Power Jacks are quite similar to jumping jacks, except a person squats lower and jumps as high as possible during each repetition.

Half jacks
A similar jump exercise is called half-jacks, which were created to prevent rotator cuff injuries, which have been linked to the repetitive movements of the exercise.  They are like regular jumping jacks but the arms go halfway above the head instead of all the way above it. The arms also hit the sides to help tighten the jump.

Records
The most jumping jacks in one minute is 110 - achieved by Gaber Kahlawi Gaber Ali at Cairo, Egypt, on October 10th, 2019.

In 2010, National Geographic Kids organized an event in 1,050 locations as a part of Michelle Obama's "Let's Move!" exercise campaign in which 300,365 people were measured doing jumping jacks (for one minute) in a 24-hour period.

See also
Split Jack

References

External links
 Star Jump Demonstration

Aerobic exercise
Jumping sports